Jakarta Taipei School (JTS), formerly Jakarta Taipei International School (JTIS) in English, is an international school maintained by the Taiwan-based Republic of China government in Jakarta, Indonesia. The school takes Taiwanese (ROC) citizens and students of other nationalities, offering kindergarten through senior high school classes taught with the Taiwanese curriculum.

As of 2016, the school had 30 teachers, 180 Taiwanese students, and 100 students of other citizenships.

History
The school opened in 1991 with the Taipei Economic and Trade Office in Jakarta assisting. It was first established on 10 January 1992, making it the first Chinese-language school in Indonesia since the Indonesian government ended its ban on the Chinese language.

See also

 Chinese Indonesians
 Indonesia–Taiwan relations

References

External links
 Jakarta Taipei School
 Jakarta Taipei School 

Taiwanese international schools
International schools in Jakarta
1991 establishments in Indonesia
Educational institutions established in 1991
North Jakarta